Salim Barakat (born   1 September 1951 in Qamishli) is a Kurdish-Syrian novelist and poet. He was brought up in Qamishli in northern Syria and spent most of his youth there. In 1970 he moved to Damascus to study Arabic literature but after one year he moved to Beirut where he stayed until 1982. While in Beirut he published five volumes of poetry, a diary and two volumes of autobiography. He moved to Cyprus and worked as a managing editor of the prestigious Palestinian journal Al-Karmel, whose editor was Mahmoud Darwish. In 1999 he moved to Sweden, where he still resides.

His works explore his own Kurdish culture and chronicle their plight and history, as well as Arab, Assyrian, Armenian, Circassian and Yazidi culture. His earliest major prose work, Al-Jundub al-Hadidi ("The Iron Grasshopper"), is an autobiographical narration of his childhood in Qamishli. The book explores the violent and raw conditions of his early adolescent life, suffused with nostalgic feelings for the Kurdish land and culture. The first part of the book's lengthy subtitle translates to, "The unfinished memoir of a child who never saw anything but a fugitive land."

Barakat is considered one of the most innovative poets and novelists writing in the Arabic language. Stefan G. Meyer has described his style as "the closest by any Arab writer's to that of Latin American magical realism" and has called Barakat "perhaps the master prose stylist writing in Arabic today". Due to his complex style and application of techniques taken from classical Arabic literature, his influence has been almost one of a "neoclassicist."

Published works (in Arabic)

Novels
 (1985) The Sages of Darkness
 (1987) Geometric Spirits
 (1990) The Feathers
 (1993) The Camps of Infinity
 (1994) The Astrologers on the Tuesday of Death: Crossing of the Flamingo
 (1996) The Astrologers on the Tuesday of Death: Cosmos
 (1997) The Astrologers on the Tuesday of Death: The Liver of Milaeus
 (1999) Debris of the Second Eternity
 (2001) Seals and Nebula
 (2003) Delshad
 (2004) The Caves of Haydrahodahose
 (2005) Thadrimis
 (2006) Novice Dead
 (2007) The Sand Ladders
 (2008) The Anguish of Indescribable Perplexing Intimacy in the Voice of Sarmak
 (2010) The Agitation of Geese
 (2010) Crushed Hoofs in Haydrahodahose
 (2011) Vacant Sky Over Jerusalem
 (2012) Vacant Sky Over Jerusalem, Part II
 (2013) The Mermaid and her Daughters
 (2014) Prisoners of Mount Ayayanu East
 (2016) Regions of the Djinn
 (2016) The Captives of Sinjar
 (2017) The Roaring of Shadows in Zenobia's Gardens
 (2018) A Biography of Existence and a Brief History of Resurrection

 (2019) What about the Jewish lady Rachel?
 (2020) Encyclopedia of Perfection without Distortion: The Genesis of Minerals
 (2021) Medusa does not comb her hair
 (2021) The Snow is more treacherous in the Spruce Forests
 (2022) Those Little Girls and their Paper Bags

Poetry
 (1973) Each Newcomer Shall Hail Me, So Shall Each Outgoer
 (1975) Thus Do I Disperse Moussissana
 (1977) For the Dust, for Shamdin, for Cycles of Prey and Cycles of Kingdoms
 (1979) The Throngs
 (1981) The Cranes
 (1983) By the Very Traps, by the Very Foxes Leading the Wind
 (1991) The Falconer
 (1996) Recklessness of the Ruby
 (1997) Confrontations, Covenants, Threshing Floors, Adversities, etc.
 (2000) Hefts
 (2005) Lexicon
 (2008) The People of Three O'clock at Dawn on the Third Thursday
 (2009) Translating Basalt
 (2011) The Flood
 (2012) The Haughtiness of Homogeneity
 (2012) Gods
 (2014) The North of Hearts or their West
 (2015) Syria
 (2016) The Great Poem of Love
 (2016) All the doors
 (2018) Alerting the Animal to its Ancestry
 (2019) The Spoils of the Athletes and the Teachings they adhere to 
 (2021) The Five Hundred Shrapnels
 (2022) Spiritual Denunciation

Autobiographies
 (1976) Church of the Warrior
 (1980) The Iron Grasshopper
 (1982) Play High the Trumpet, Play It the Highest

Collections
 (1992) Diwan
 (1999) Pharmacopoeia (Collected essays)
 (2007) Poetical Works (Collected poems 1973–2005)
 (2010) Expediting the Loans of Prose (Essays and articles 1983–2008)
 (2017) Poetical Works 2 (Collected poems 2008–2016)

Children's books
 (1975) Narjis
 (1980) Who Guards the Earth?
 (1980) Sleep

See also
Syrian literature

References

1951 births
Living people
People from Qamishli
Syrian Kurdish people
Syrian novelists
Syrian poets
Kurdish poets
Syrian emigrants to Sweden